The Power of Joe Simon is the eighth studio album recorded by American singer Joe Simon, released in 1973 on the Spring Records label.

Chart performance
The album peaked at No. 15 on the R&B albums chart. It also reached No. 97 on the Billboard 200. The album features the singles "Power of Love", which peaked at No. 1 on the Hot Soul Singles chart and No. 11 on the Billboard Hot 100, "Trouble in My Home", which reached No. 5 on the Hot Soul Singles Chart and No. 50 on the Billboard Hot 100, and "Step by Step", which charted at No. 6 on the Hot Soul Singles chart, No. 67 on the Billboard Hot 100 and No. 14 on the UK Singles Chart.

Track listing

Charts

Singles

References

External links
 

1973 albums
Joe Simon (musician) albums
Albums produced by Kenneth Gamble
Albums produced by Leon Huff
Spring Records albums